Faisalabad Dry Port is a dry port in Faisalabad, Pakistan. It is managed by the Faisalabad Dryport Trust. It works in cooperation with DP World, which provides rail freight transport from the dry-port. The rail track extents to Port Qasim, Karachi.

History 

The dryport was founded in 1996. The city's booming textile industry saw huge growth in exports of textiles, yarns, fibres, clothing and apparel products. The dryport was incorporated into the existing rail network and linked to the seaport of Port Qasim, Karachi.

References 

Dry ports of Pakistan
Faisalabad